Barletta is a city, comune  of Apulia, in south eastern Italy. Barletta is the capoluogo, together with Andria and Trani, of the Province of Barletta-Andria-Trani. It has  a population of around 94,700 citizens.

The city's territory belongs to the Valle dell'Ofanto. The Ofanto river crosses the countryside and forms the border between the territory of Barletta and that of Margherita di Savoia. The mouth of the river is in the territory of Barletta.

The area of Barletta also includes part of the battlefield of Cannae. This is a very important archeological site, remembered for the major battle in 216 BCE between the Romans and the Carthaginians, won by Hannibal. The site has been recognised as Città d'Arte (city of art) of Apulia in the 2005 for the beautiful architecture. Cannae flourished in the Roman period and then after a series of debilitating Saracen attacks, was finally destroyed by the Normans and then abandoned in the early Middle Ages.

Barletta is home to the Colossus of Barletta, a bronze statue, representing a Roman Emperor (perhaps Theodosius II). According to a local folk story, Eraclio saved the city from a Saracen attack. Seeing the Saracen ships approaching Barletta's coast, Eraclio waited for them on the sea shore. Here Eraclio acted as if he was crying so the Saracens asked him why he was sad and Eraclio answered that he was sad because he was the smallest among Barletta's inhabitants and so everybody made fun of him. The Saracens thought that Barletta's inhabitants were all giants so left the coast, fearing to face them.

In 1503 Barletta was the location of the disfida di Barletta ("Joust of Barletta"), a battle during which 13 Italian knights commanded by Ettore Fieramosca challenged and defeated an equal number of French knights who were at the time prisoners of war, in a joust held near Andria. This episode was documented in 1833 by Massimo d'Azeglio, who wrote the novel "Ettore Fieramosca o la Disfida di Barletta". In the book the author regards this episode as one of the earliest manifestations of Italian national pride.  

The city at the time was fairly loosely besieged by French forces, and occupied by a Spanish army under the command of Gonzalo de Cordoba the 'Gran Capitan'.

Barletta has one gold medal for military valour and another one for civil valour, for its resistance to an incursion of German Fallschirmjäger who destroyed the port in order to prevent its falling intact into the hands of the advancing British Eighth Army during World War II.

Geography 
Barletta is located on the Adriatic coast, where the rocky shore is covered with silt from the Ofanto river. The river forms the boundary of the provinces of Bari and Foggia and has always influenced the agricultural activities of the area. The river also marks the passage from the Murgia to the fertile plain of the Tavoliere, which starts in Barletta.

Barletta is situated on the south-west end of the Gulf of Manfredonia and sits opposite the promontory of Gargano. On its borders are: the Adriatic coast to the north; Trani  to the south-east; Canosa di Puglia  to the south-west; the mouth of the Ofanto river  to the north-west; and the town of Margherita di Savoia  to the west.

Its climate is moderated by the sea. Winds are usually from the south. Rainfall is low; Barletta receives  of rain annually, with most of the rain in autumn and winter during which day-long deluges occur. Rain is minimal between the second half of June and the first half of August.

The comune comprises two parts, Montaltino and Fiumara. The communes next to Barletta are: Andria, Canosa di Puglia, Margherita di Savoia, San Ferdinando di Puglia, Trani, and Trinitapoli.

The city is endowed with a very long, sandy coast stretching to both the east and the west from the commercial port. Along the coast, there are various attractive beaches with trees to the west.

History 

Barletta developed long before the Roman era, known by Greeks and Romans respectively as Bardulos or Barulum, from Illyrian name "Bardylis" its origin dates back one  before the arrival of either in the region,at the end of the Bronze Age (11th-10th centuries BC) and during the transition to the Iron Age, Illyrian groups from the eastern Adriatic migrated to Italy. 

In the Middle Ages it was a stronghold of the Normans and Lombards, becoming an important staging post for the Crusaders and the Teutonic Knights and Templars as well as the Knights of St.John. Following the Muslim conquest in the Holy Land, the Archbishops of Nazareth took refuge in Barletta (permanently in 1327).

After immigration from the nearby Canne increased its population due to the destruction of Cannae by the Normans, Barletta lived its periods of greatest splendour under King Frederick II and then subsequently the Angevin kings of Naples.

At the beginning of the 16th century, during the guerilla war between the French and the Spanish over possession of Southern Italy, the city was the theater of a historical victory of Italian knights over French prisoners, in what became known as the Challenge of Barletta (13 February 1503). This took place during the occupation of the city by Gonzalo de Cordoba, and served as a handy diversion for his restive siege-bound army. Later the city served as a fortress for the Spanish rulers of southern Italy. In 1528 it was sacked by French troops under Odet de Foix.

The city was the capital of its district and the seat of the lower prefecture for the 120 years between 1806 and 1927 and sided with the French under Joachim Murat during the Napoleonic War.

During and after the Unification, Barletta was as poor as was most of the South of Italy. Consequently, hygiene and health were particularly bad. Various types of disease plagued the population, such as  tuberculosis, diarrhea, pneumonia, small pox, malaria, etc. An estimated 15% of the population was affected by trachoma. The most dreaded of the diseases brought by poverty was cholera. Outbreaks of cholera took place in the city in 1836, 1854, 1865, 1866, 1867, 1886 and finally 1910 when the bacillus was brought back to Barletta by Barlettan fishermen, and killed tens of thousands all over southern Italy. Barletta also has a religious dark side to it when the very last Protestants to be burned alive at the stake took place in 1866. "The Papists came out of Santo Sepolcro, in their rampage to martyr Protestants as they screamed, “Death to the Protestants!’” (London Times, 9 April 1866) A 100 year anniversary plaque to the five Protestant martyrs can be seen at the Evangelical Baptist Church (Italian, “Chiesa Evangelica Battista”) of Barletta.

During World War II, the city was the site of the first episode of Italian conflict with German troops, when a battalion of Fallschirmjäger (parachutists) was sent from Foggia to Barletta to destroy the port before the British 8th Army could arrive, the Italian garrison surrendered after a brief struggle, thereby earning the Gold Medal of Military Valour and of Civilian Merit.

After the war it was the site of a DP camp.

Main sights 
The principal monuments of the city are:

 The Castle, a structure initially erected in the 10th century by the Normans as a typical motte and bailey structure. During the Crusade period, it was a used as a hostel for soldiers leaving for the Holy Land. It was upgraded and enlarged substantially under the reign of Frederick II between 1225 and 1228. This corresponds to the period in which he launched a crusade from here, the Sixth Crusade. The castle was later expanded under the House of Anjou, when Barletta became an important centre of Aragonese-Spanish control in the area, in 1527. Charles had the building expanded again and the four massive bastions added to create the present fortress form. In 1915 the fortress, then in use as a barracks and military store, was bombarded by the Austro-Hungarian scout cruiser . In September 1943 it was the setting of an Italian military defence unit against a German army.
 Colossus of Barletta: a large bronze statue of a Roman Emperor.
 Basilica of the Holy Sepulchre (Basilica of San Sepolcro): adjacent to Colossus, this church was built in the 12th-century and the former headquarters outside the city walls of the Knights of Malta, it stood next to a hospital for pilgrims (now demolished) to the Holy Land during the medieval period, a Romanesque church with particular Oriental influences from Jerusalem. The façade represents the Baroque style.
 Cathedral of Santa Maria Maggiore: erected on the former site of the temple of Neptune, is an example of the fusion of Gothic and Roman styles. In its interior, at a lower level, are grotticella tombs from the 3rd century BC, over which is the Palaeo-Christian basilica (6th century AD) with another basilica being added to that in the 9th century. In the 12th century a new building was erected in Romanesque style, being consecrated in 1267; this was renovated in the Gothic style in the 14th century
 San Giacomo: 11th-century church named after St James the Great ('Matamoros' or Saracen-slayer), was erected on the site of what had been the temple of Isis in Roman times. Toppled by the earthquake that nearly razed Barletta, it was soon rebuilt and re-consecrated in 1751.
 The Cellar of the Challenge, a former prison for galley slaves.
 Palace of the Marra: Baroque palace outside Salento, now housing the Pinacoteca Giuseppe De Nittis.
 Canne della Battaglia: archeologic site, location of the Battle of Cannae.

Government

Economy 
Barletta is a city whose economy is based on the manufacture of concrete and cement. To a lesser degree, it is also a city of agriculture, of which grapes and olives form the most widespread crops.

Transportation 
Barletta railway station is reachable by train from the FS Adriatic Railway main line (Trenitalia company), from the Bari–Barletta railway (Ferrovie del Nord Barese), and from the Barletta–Spinazzola railway (Trenitalia).  The FNB also has a second station in the city.

Other than Barletta's commercial port, there are no sea connections, though Bari and other cities have ferry services across the Adriatic.

International relations

Twin towns — Sister cities
Barletta is twinned with:

 Herceg Novi, Montenegro

Notable people 
 Roger of Cannae (1060–1121), saint, bishop of Cannae and patroon of Barletta
 Gabriel Barletta (15th century), Dominican preacher
 Alessandra Benucci, wife of Ludovico Ariosto
 Ettore Fieramosca (1476–1515), head of the Italian knights participating in the famous Joust of Barletta in 1503.
 Mariano Santo (1488–1577), surgeon
 Giovan Leonardo Primavera (c. 1540–85), composer and poet
 Carlo Cafiero (1846–92), anarchist and supporter of Mikhail Bakunin who ripped him off.
 Giuseppe De Nittis (1846–84), impressionist painter
 Mario Gallo (1878–1945) influential director in the Cinema of Argentina
 Carlo Maria Giulini (1914–2005), orchestra director
 Francesco Monterisi (1934– ), cardinal
 Carlo Albanese, father of Anthony Albanese, Prime Minister of Australia 2022-
 Pietro Mennea (1952–2013), for 17 years was the world-record holder in the 200m sprint and won the gold medal at the 1980 Olympics in Moscow.
 Gennaro Delvecchio (1978– ), national footballer for Italy
Francesco Lotoro (1964-), composer and Holocaust music archivist.

References

External links 

 
 www.barlettaweb.com Barletta city web site

 
Cities and towns in Apulia
Coastal towns in Apulia
Port cities and towns of the Adriatic Sea